This is a list of episodes of the eleventh season of The Ellen DeGeneres Show (often stylized as e11en), which aired from September 9, 2013 to June 3, 2014.

Episodes

References

External links
 

11
2013 American television seasons
2014 American television seasons